Super Junior-K.R.Y. Asia Tour 2015: Phonograph is the second solo concert held by Super Junior-K.R.Y. to promote their single Join Hands. The Asia tour commenced with two shows in Seoul from 22–23 August, continued in Taipei, Bangkok, Shanghai, Hongkong and ended in Tangerang.

Summary 
Super Junior-K.R.Y. during Super Show 6 Encore Concert in Seoul announced their Asia tour July 11–12. Official announcement released by SM Entertainment on 17 July 2015.  Ticket went on sale after five days on July 22, 2015.

On November 15, 2015 the Indonesian promoter revealed Phonograph's Jakarta concert date. The Indonesian show guest is Leeteuk. Ryeowook sung local songs from Indonesian band Noah - Separuh Aku and Bebi Romeo - Bunga terakhir.

Tour dates

Setlist

Guest

Discography

Personnel 
 Super Junior-K.R.Y. (Yesung, Ryeowook, Kyuhyun)
 Tour organizer: SM Entertainment
 Tour promoter: Dream Makers

References

External links 
 Super Junior Official Website 

2015 concert tours
2016 concert tours
Super Junior-K.R.Y concert tours